William Leandersson (born 9 January 1984) is a Swedish footballer who plays as a defender.

References

External links

1984 births
Living people
Association football defenders
IF Elfsborg players
Mjällby AIF players
Allsvenskan players
Superettan players
Swedish footballers